Tada-U or Tadau is a town in central Myanmar about  from the provincial capital of Mandalay.

Transport 
It is served by a branch line of the Myanmar Railways built in 1994. Tada Oo- Myotha Railway Line is end in Pyithayar Station(Gwaykone) Tada Oo.

See also 
Transport in Burma
Tada-U District

References 

Populated places in Mandalay Region
Township capitals of Myanmar